Ariyallur  is a census town in Malappuram district in the state of Kerala, India. It is situated in Vallikkunnu Gramapanchayath and newly formed Vallikkunnu Legislative Assembly constituency.

Demographics
 India census, Ariyallur had a population of 18987 with 9164 males and 9823 females.
Hindus form majority

Transportation
The nearest airport is at karipur Airport.  The nearest major railway station is at Vallikkunnu.

Places of interest
Vallikkunnu Railway Station is situated in Ariyallur. M V Higher Secondary School, G U P School, are important schools. Ariyallur is also famous for Agricultural Nurseries.
It has a coast of about 4 Kilometers. Muthiyam Turtle Sanctuary is on this coast.

References

Cities and towns in Malappuram district
Populated coastal places in India
Parappanangadi area